William J. Grattan (May 20, 1876 – December 6, 1938) was an American lawyer and politician from New York.

Life
He was born  in West Troy, Albany County, New York. The family moved to Cohoes in 1887. He attended St. Augustine's Academy in Lansingburgh, St. Bernard's Academy in Cohoes, and the Albany Business College. Then he studied law with Myer Nussbaum, and at Albany Law School. He graduated in 1898, was admitted to the bar the same year, and practiced law in Albany.

He was a page of the New York State Assembly in 1892 and 1893; Assistant Librarian of the Assembly in 1894; Assistant Postmaster of the Assembly in 1895; and Private Secretary to State Senator Myer Nussbaum from 1896 to 1898.

Grattan was a member of the New York State Assembly (Albany Co., 4th D.) in 1903, 1904, 1905 and 1906.

He was a member of the New York State Senate (28th D.) from 1907 to 1910, sitting in the 130th, 131st, 132nd and 133rd New York State Legislatures.

Later, he was Clerk of Albany County for two terms.

He died on December 6, 1938, after a heart attack.

Sources
Official New York from Cleveland to Hughes by Charles Elliott Fitch (Hurd Publishing Co., New York and Buffalo, 1911, Vol. IV; pg. 346, 348, 350f and 366f)
The New York Red Book by Edgar L. Murlin (1903; pg. 137f)
DECLARES BARNES CONTROLS ALBANY in NYT on September 13, 1914
WILLIAM J. GRATTAN, EX-LEGISLATOR, 61 in NYT on December 6, 1938 (subscription required)

1876 births
1938 deaths
Republican Party New York (state) state senators
People from Cohoes, New York
Republican Party members of the New York State Assembly
Albany Business College alumni
Albany Law School alumni
People from Watervliet, New York